The Thompson King Miners were a junior ice hockey team from Thompson, Manitoba, Canada.  The King Miners were members of the Manitoba Junior Hockey League and the NorMan Junior Hockey League.

History
The Thompson King Miners joined the Manitoba Junior Hockey League in 1975.  After three rough seasons, the King Miners folded in 1978.  One of the big problems for the team was that they were fairly remote compared to the rest of the teams in the MJHL due to their distance from Winnipeg, the central-point of the MJHL.

In the summer of 1978, the people of Thompson did not want to lose their Junior team, so along with the people of Flin Flon (who just dropped out of the Western Canada Junior Hockey League) formed a Junior B league (NorMan Junior Hockey League) with The Pas Huskies and the Snow Lake Spartans.  Flin Flon would be the first league champion and eventually win the Manitoba Provincial Junior B Hockey Championship in 1979.  In the summer of 1979, based on the strength of the Flin Flon and Thompson clubs, the league was promoted to Junior "A" to compete for the Centennial Cup.  That first season of the NorMan League, the team would be known as the "Nickel Knights", but the name was soon dropped.

1979–80
The King Miners would win the first ever NorMan Junior "A" title by defeating the Flin Flon Bombers 3-games-to-none.  They then faced the MJHL Champion for the Turnbull Cup, the Manitoba Junior Championship.  The MJHL Champion Selkirk Steelers defeated them 3-games-to-none (6-2, 13-2, and 7-4) to move on to the Anavet Cup against the Saskatchewan Junior Hockey League champion.

1980–81
The King Miners take their second straight NJHL crown by defeating the Flin Flon Bombers 4-games-to-2, despite finishing second to them in the league standings.  In the Turnbull Cup, the MJHL's St. Boniface Saints defeated them 3-games-to-none (6-4, 11-4, and 9-2) to move on to the Anavet Cup.

1984–85
After not winning the league for three straight seasons, the King Miners won what would be the last NJHL championship in 1985.  At the Turnbull Cup, the Selkirk Steelers of the MJHL defeated them (8-3, 5-0, and 6-3) to move on to the Anavet Cup.

The End
With Flin Flon moving to the Saskatchewan Junior Hockey League in 1984, the NorMan League with Thompson, The Pas, and Snow Lake folded unceremoniously at the end of the 1984-85 season.  Although there were attempts to expand the league into Saskatchewan, the league was never able to come back from the lack of teams and never played another season.  This would be the end of Junior hockey in Thompson.

Season-by-season standings

Note a: Withdrew from League Jan 9, 1978. 19 games were counted as default losses.

Playoffs
MJHL Years
1976 DNQ
1977 Lost Quarter-final
Dauphin Kings defeated Thompson King Miners 4-games-to-none
1978 Did Not Complete Season
NJHL Years
1979 Lost Final
Thompson King Miners defeated Snow Lake Spartans 13-goals-to-2 in 2 games
Flin Flon Bombers defeated Thompson King Miners
1980 Won League, Lost Turnbull Cup
Thompson King Miners defeated Snow Lake Spartans 3-games-to-2
Thompson King Miners defeated Flin Flon Bombers 3-games-to-none NJHL CHAMPIONS
Selkirk Steelers (MJHL) defeated Thompson King Miners 3-games-to-none
1981 Won League, Lost Turnbull Cup
Thompson King Miners defeated Snow Lake Spartans 4-games-to-none
Thompson King Miners defeated Flin Flon Bombers 4-games-to-2 NJHL CHAMPIONS
St. Boniface Saints (MJHL) defeated Thompson King Miners 3-games-to-none
1982 Lost Final
Thompson King Miners defeated Snow Lake Spartans
Flin Flon Bombers defeated Thompson King Miners 4-games-to-none
1983 Possibly DNQ
1984 Lost Final
Flin Flon Bombers defeated Thompson King Miners 4-games-to-3
1985 Won League, Lost Turnbull Cup
Thompson King Miners defeated Snow Lake Spartans 4-games-to-1 NJHL CHAMPIONS
Selkirk Steelers (MJHL) defeated Thompson King Miners 3-games-to-none

External links
Thompson Minor Hockey
Hockey Manitoba
Manitoba Junior Hockey League

Defunct Manitoba Junior Hockey League teams
Thompson, Manitoba